Stonaker Cottage is a historic cure cottage located at Saranac Lake in the town of Harrietstown, Franklin County, New York.  It was built in 1916 for the personal use of Edwin and Jeanne Stonaker. It is a one-story, wood-frame dwelling sided in shingles and covered by a shallow pitched asphalt roof with deep overhanging eaves.  It features a large central octagonal cure porch with quartz windows, flanked by two smaller hexagonal bays.

It was sold in 1932, and was listed on the National Register of Historic Places in 1992.

References

Houses on the National Register of Historic Places in New York (state)
Prairie School architecture in New York (state)
Houses completed in 1916
Houses in Franklin County, New York
National Register of Historic Places in Franklin County, New York